Martin Lang (born May 20, 1949) is an American former foil fencer.

Early and personal life
Lang was born in Jersey City, New Jersey, later lived in Glen Oaks, Queens, New York, and is Jewish. He attended Martin Van Buren High School in Queens, along with Steve Kaplan who also became an Olympic fencer. After graduating from NYU with a Bachelor of Science degree, he attended New York University for graduate studies.

He worked 22 years in the hotel industry, and ten years in the automotive industry. Lang lives in Spring Hill, Tennessee. He owns his own club in Nashville, Tennessee.

Fencing career
Lang fenced foil for New York University (class of 1972), where he attended the School of Education, and was 25‐3 for the season and finished second in the IFA foil competition in 1970–71. He was co-captain of the team in 1971–72, and was an NCAA First Team All American in 1972. He was 55–5 in his NYU career. He then fenced for Salle Santelli and for the New York Athletic Club.

At the 1975 Pan American Games in Mexico City, Lang won the individual Foil Championship (the first American in 20 years to win a gold medal at the Pan American Games in foil), and also won a team foil silver medal.

Lang competed in the individual and team foil events at the 1976 Summer Olympics in Montreal, at 27 years of age.

He won the U.S. National Foil Championship in 1978, and Lang was a five-time U.S. National Men's Foil Team Champion. Lang was inducted into the NYU Hall of Fame in 2012.

References

External links
 

1949 births
Living people
American male foil fencers
Olympic fencers of the United States
Fencers at the 1976 Summer Olympics
Sportspeople from Jersey City, New Jersey
Pan American Games medalists in fencing
Pan American Games gold medalists for the United States
Pan American Games silver medalists for the United States
NYU Violets fencers
Jewish American sportspeople
Jewish male foil fencers
Sportspeople from Queens, New York
People from Spring Hill, Tennessee
Martin Van Buren High School alumni
Fencers at the 1975 Pan American Games
21st-century American Jews
Medalists at the 1975 Pan American Games